Lauri Kalevi Remes (10 August 1925 - 18 March 1984) was a Finnish farmer and politician, born in Kiuruvesi. He was a member of the Parliament of Finland, representing the Finnish Rural Party (SMP) in 1972 and the Finnish People's Unity Party (SKYP) from 1972 to 1975.

References

1925 births
1984 deaths
People from Kiuruvesi
Finnish Rural Party politicians
Finnish People's Unity Party politicians
Members of the Parliament of Finland (1972–75)